Ernest Romens (1904–1954) was a French racewalker.

Romens won the extreme racewalking, Paris-Strasbourg march in 1933, 1935 and 1937. At its third victory, he broke the record time 300 km of road. He received dozens of telegrams from the American Alsatian community, which followed his progress in the press.

Bibliography
 André Rauch (1997). La marche la vie. Edition autrement.

External links
 E.R 1904-1954
 website history Marchons.com
 Official website Paris-Colmar à la marche
 Centurions History
 WALK! Magazine

French ultramarathon runners
1904 births
1954 deaths
French male racewalkers
Male ultramarathon runners